Boxing's origins began in the United States in 19th century. The United States became the center of professional boxing in the early 20th century.

History

The sport of boxing came to the United States from England in the late 1700s and took root in the 1800s mainly in large urban areas such as Boston, New York City, and New Orleans.

John L. Sullivan became the first American heavyweight champion in 1882 under the bare knuckle boxing rules and again in 1892, becoming the first world Heavyweight champion of the gloved era. He was defeated by James Corbett, often referred to as the father of modern boxing due to his innovative scientific technique, in 1892.

Jack Johnson was the first African American heavyweight champion.

Professional boxing

In 1920, the Walker Law legalized prizefighting in New York state by establishing the New York State Athletic Commission. In response, representatives from 13 states established the National Boxing Association and also began to sanction title fights. The NYSAC and NBA sometimes crowned different "world champions" in the same division, leading to confusion about who was the real champion.

Jack Dempsey became one of the most popular athletes in the 1920s promoted by the likes of Tex Rickard.

In the 1940s and 1950s, many African American boxers were restricted by the competitions they could enter, see Murderers' Row . 

After World War II, television took on an important role in professional boxing. It was popular  because of its relatively low production costs compared with other sports, professional boxing was a major  feature of television programming throughout much of the 1950s and early 1960s.

In the 1960s and 1970s, Muhammad Ali became an iconic figure, transformed the role and image of the African American athlete in America by his embrace of racial pride, and transcended the sport by refusing to serve in the Vietnam War. In the 1980s and 1990s, major boxers such as Mike Tyson and Riddick Bowe were marked by crime and self-destruction.

Amateur boxing

The Amateur Athletic Union of the United States was founded in 1888 and began its annual championships in boxing the same year. In 1926 the Chicago Tribune started a boxing competition called the Golden Gloves. The United States of America Amateur Boxing Federation (now USA Boxing), which governs American amateur boxing, was formed after Amateur Sports Act of 1978 enabled the governance of sports in the US by organizations other than the AAU. This act made each sport set up its own National governing body (NGB). Each of these governing bodies would be part of the United States Olympic Committee, but would not be run by the Committee.

In 1992 Dallas Malloy won a case and USA Boxing admitted women to its program, being the first governing body in the world to do so.

An international organization  for amateur boxing was begun in 1946, known as the International Amateur Boxing Association. The development amateur scene of boxing has seen the United States as a world beater. In the Olympics the US has won 106 Olympic medals to date: 47 gold, 23 silver and 36 bronzes. Most heavyweight champions of this century originate from the United States.

Women's boxing

The first recorded women's boxing match in the United States occurred in New York in 1888, when Hattie Leslie beat Alice Leary in a brutal fight.

Women's boxing at a professional and amateur was rarely acknowledged until 1970's  Cathy 'Cat' Davis , Marian Trimiar and Jackie Tonawanda were pioneers as they were the first women in the United States to get a license for boxing in the United States. Cathty Davis was the female boxer to appear on the cover of Ring Magazine.

In the 1990s, Women's boxing had a brief period of popularity due to likes of Christy Martin and Laila Ali. But early into 2000's, the sport fell back to relative obscurity due to lack of promotion, television exposure and poor matchmaking. Many female professional boxers in the United States struggle to make a viable living due to lack of financial opportunities and promotional opportunities. In 2012, interest in women's boxing was revived when women were allowed to compete in boxing at the Olympic games for the first time.

Television and media coverage
Boxing used to be a popular staple viewing on American television due to its low costs and production values and was broadcast on all the major networks. Since the 1970s, it is mostly broadcast on pay-per-view and pay television channels, like HBO and Showtime. However, this and a myriad of factors resulted the sport's decline in popularity beginning in the late 1990s. One noted factor was the sport's exclusivity to these premium outlets, while mixed martial arts events were eventually broadcast on major television networks and more accessible platforms, drawing in a younger demographic and more mainstream coverage.

It was hoped that the 2015 Floyd Mayweather Jr. vs. Manny Pacquiao PPV would re-invigorate interest in the sport in the United States, but the eponymous main event was considered disappointing and was perceived as doing further harm to the image of the sport. 2015 would also mark the launch of Al Haymon's Premier Boxing Champions, which would help reintroduce the sport to mainstream audiences by airing events on both broadcast and cable networks and incorporating thematic elements to court  younger viewership. At its peak, the series saw 4.8 million viewers for the 2016 Errol Spence Jr. vs Leonard Bundu telecast on NBC.

The 2017 match between Floyd Mayweather Jr. vs. Conor McGregor garnered major mainstream attention, in-part due to the celebrity status of UFC fighter Conor McGregor. The event received 4.3 million domestic buys; the second-highest buy rate in pay-per-view history. In the same year, Top Rank began a multi-year broadcasting agreement with ESPN, in which the network would broadcast events airing across its linear and digital properties, and an option to carry events on pay-per-view. ESPN would extend the agreement through 2025 on August 2, 2018.

See also
Boxing Firms in the U.S
 Don King Productions
 Golden Boy Promotions
 Top Rank
Boxing on U.S Television
 Boxing After Dark
 Boxing on CBS
 Boxing on ESPN
 Boxing on NBC
 Fight of the Week
 HBO World Championship Boxing
 Premier Boxing Champions
 Showtime Championship Boxing

References